"Afterglow of Your Love" is a song by the English rock group Small Faces. The song was originally simply titled "Afterglow" on the album on which it first appeared in May 1968,  Ogdens' Nut Gone Flake. Without authorisation from the band, the song was released as a single in 1969 and reached no. 36 on the UK Singles Chart. 

In March 1969 the Small Faces officially broke up, with Steve Marriott going on to form Humble Pie with Peter Frampton and Greg Ridley. Their manager and proprietor of their record label Andrew Loog Oldham quickly released "Afterglow" as a final single without the group's permission. Now called "Afterglow of Your Love", this soulful power ballad appeared in a noticeably different, slightly sped-up mix from the version that originally appeared on Ogdens, removing the song's acoustic introduction and adding a longer instrumental coda. It was coupled with a contrasting hard rock number on the B-side, which was mis-titled on both cover and label as "Wham Bam Thank You Man" (the song's actual title is "Wham Bam Thank You Mam" - or, even more correctly - "Ma'am"). To this day, some of the less well-researched Small Faces reissues still carry this incorrect title for the song. One of the final few tracks the Small Faces completed in late 1968, the hard-rocking sound of "Wham Bam Thank You Ma'am" strongly indicated the musical direction Marriott would continue to pursue with Humble Pie. Several "Best of" compilations contain a different, slower version of the song. There is also a live version.  Three years later, David Bowie borrowed the title of the track for a line called out at the climax of his rock high-life anthem Suffragette City.

The single reached No. 36 in the UK Singles Chart.  The following November, Immediate released a final unauthorised album entitled The Autumn Stone.  It included many of their hits, including unreleased material and three live tracks recorded at Newcastle City Hall.

"Afterglow" was recorded at Olympic Studios, London.

"Wham Bam Thank You Mam" was released, under the title "Sparky Rides" or "Sparky Riders", as a Rod Stewart recording on several budget CD compilations.

Cover versions
Australian singer-songwriter Daryl Braithwaite covered the song in October 1977. The single peaked at number 37 on the Kent Music Report.
Quiet Riot covered the song on their second album Quiet Riot II (1978), and released a remixed acoustic version on The Randy Rhoads Years (1993).
Great White covered the song on their 1991 album Hooked
Flo & Eddie covered the song on the album Flo & Eddie 1973

Song references
"Wham Bam Thank You Mam": David Bowie, an avowed fan of the Small Faces, references the song by using the phrase in his own song, Suffragette City.

See also
Small Faces discography

References

External links
Small Faces on Wapping Wharf
Small Faces on Room for Ravers

1969 singles
1977 singles
Small Faces songs
Songs written by Ronnie Lane
Songs written by Steve Marriott
Immediate Records singles
1969 songs